Cosimo Boscaglia (c. 1550 – 1621) was a professor of philosophy at the University of Pisa in Italy. He is the first person known to have accused Galileo of possible heresy for defending the heliocentric system of Copernicus, in 1613.

References

Italian philosophers
1550s births
1621 deaths